Joseph Adrien Raymond Laplante (born December 15, 1925) is a Canadian former professional hockey player who played 435 games for the Providence Reds in the American Hockey League.

External links
 

1925 births
Living people
People from Lachine, Quebec
Providence Reds players
Ice hockey people from Montreal
Canadian ice hockey centres